The 2011–12 Ryobi One-Day Cup was the 42nd season of official List A domestic cricket in Australia.

The season's format reverted to the 50-overs a side format, with Cricket Australia acknowledging the ICC's
commitment to 50-over cricket and the 2015 ICC World Cup most likely be staged as a 50-over
tournament. Unlike previous
seasons, the competition was not a "complete double round robin", and each state played eight preliminary matches instead of ten.

The 2011–12 competition was won by the South Australian Redbacks. The
final's result was a tie, but the Redbacks had gained a "bonus point" in the round robin series that put them ahead of the
Tasmanian Tigers.
The win was South Australia's first One-day domestic title in 25 years.

Table

Fixtures

October 2011

November 2011

December 2011

February 2012

Final

References

External links
 Cricket Australia Website

Ryobi One-Day Cup
Australian domestic limited-overs cricket tournament seasons
Ryobi